The following is a list of notable deaths in June 2002.

Entries for each day are listed alphabetically by surname. A typical entry lists information in the following sequence:
 Name, age, country of citizenship at birth, subsequent country of citizenship (if applicable), reason for notability, cause of death (if known), and reference.

June 2002

1
Sir Michael Alexander, 65, British diplomat (Ambassador to Austria, Ambassador to NATO).
Hansie Cronje, 32, South African cricketer, air crash.
Joseph Nanven Garba, 58, Nigerian soldier, diplomat and politician.
Tibor Scitovsky, 91, Hungarian-American economist.

2
Boyd Bennett, 77, American rockabilly songwriter and singer ("Seventeen", "My Boy, Flat Top"), lung ailment.
Herman Cohen, 76, American film producer, launched the teen horror film genre with the 1957 cult classic I Was a Teenage Werewolf.
Hugo van Lawick, 65, Dutch wildlife filmmaker and photographer.
Flora Lewis, 79, American journalist (The Washington Post, The New York Times), cancer.
Tim Lopes, 51, Brazilian investigative journalist and television producer, murdered by organized crime.
Konrad Wirnhier, 64, German sports shooter (bronze medal in 1968 mixed skeet, gold medal in 1972 mixed skeet).

3
Antony Nicholas Allott, 77, English academic, Professor of African Law at the University of London.
Pearl Dunlevy, 92, Irish physician and epidemiologist, played a major role in the fight against TB.
Fran Rogel, 74, American football player (Penn State, Pittsburgh Steelers), Parkinson's disease.
Lew Wasserman, 89, American talent agent, studio executive and "Hollywood Mogul" (Universal Studios, Decca Records, MCA), complications from a stroke.
Laughlin Edward Waters Sr., 87, American judge (U.S. District Judge of the U.S. District Court for the Central District of California).
Sam Whipple, 41, American actor (Seven Days, The Larry Sanders Show, Open All Night), cancer.
Brian Woledge, 97, English scholar of medieval French language and literature.

4
Fernando Belaúnde, 89, Peruvian politician and President of Peru (1963–1968, 1980–1985).
Mary Boggs, 81, American muralist and textbook author.
John W. Cunningham, 86, American author.
Ann Henderson, 60, Australian politician.
Bob Lackey, 53, American professional basketball player (Marquette University, New York Nets).

5
Carlos Berlanga, 42, Spanish musician and painter.
Carmelo Bernaola, 72, Spanish composer and clarinetist.
Bill Bradley, 60, American professional basketball player (Kentucky Colonels).
Aden Abdullahi Nur, Somali politician and army general.
Dee Dee Ramone, 50, founding member of The Ramones.
Alex Watson, 70, Australian rugby league player.

6
Charles K. Bockelman, 79, American nuclear physicist.
Peter Cowan, 87, Australian writer.
Robbin Crosby, 42, American guitarist (Ratt), AIDS-related complications and heroin overdose.
Bernard Destremau, 85, French tennis player, tank officer, diplomat and politician.
Audrée Estey, 92, American dancer and actress, founded American Repertory Ballet.
Yat Malmgren, 86, Swedish dancer and acting teacher.
Betty Winkler, 88, American radio actor, one of radio's top stars in the 1930s and 1940s.

7
Wayne Cody, 65, American sportscaster.
Donald S. Fredrickson, 77, American medical researcher, a leading researcher on the links between lipids and fats and heart disease.
Rodney Hilton, 85, British medieval historian.
Lilian, Princess of Réthy, 85, British-born Belgian royal.
B. D. Jatti, 89, Indian politician and acting president of India (1977).

8
Ray Alexander, 77, jazz drummer and vibraphonist, complications from elective surgery.
Jim Coats, 88, Australian cricketer.
Yosef Goldberg, 60, Israeli farmer and politician.
George Mudie, 86, Jamaican cricketer.
Lino Tonti, 81, Italian motorcycle engineer.

9
Paul Chubb, 53, Australian actor (The Coca-Cola Kid, Stan and George's New Life, The Roly Poly Man, Dirty Deeds).
Hans Janmaat, 67, Dutch far-right politician, heart failure.
Peter Mokaba, 53, South African politician and political activist, acute pneumonia and respiratory problems.
Aleksandr Vlasov, 70, Soviet/Russian politician.
James Wheaton, 78, American actor.

10
John Gotti, 61, Italian-American gangster, throat cancer.
Maury Travis, 36, American murderer and serial killer, suicide.
Benjamin Ward, 75, first African American New York City Police Commissioner.

11
Tahseen Bashir, 77, Egyptian diplomat, spokesman for Gamal Nasser and Anwar Sadat.
Henry P. Caulfield Jr., 86, American political scientist.
Joseph A. Farinholt, 79, American World War II soldier, four-time Silver Star recipient.
Margaret E. Lynn, 78, American theater director, directed the Army's music and theater program to entertain troops.
Robert Roswell Palmer, 93, American historian and writer.
Peter John Stephens, 89, British children's author.

12
Jean de Beaumont, 98, French IOC sports administrator and Olympic sport shooter (men's team shooting at the 1924 Summer Olympics).
Bill Blass, 79, American fashion designer.
Henry Boney, 98, American baseball player (New York Giants).
John Tileston Edsall, 99, American biochemist.

13
Guilford Dudley, 94, American businessman and diplomat (U.S. Ambassador to Denmark).
Vincent Fago, 87, American comic-book artist and writer.
Isadore Familian, 90, American businessman and Jewish community leader.
Stanley L. Greigg, 71, American Watergate break-in victim.
John Hope, 83, American meteorologist, complications of an open heart surgery.
R. W. B. Lewis, 84, American literary scholar and critic and winner of the Pulitzer Prize.
Ralph Shapey, 81, American composer and conductor.
Richard Smithells, 77, British paediatrician and Emeritus professor
Maia Wojciechowska, 74, Polish-American writer of children's books (Shadow of a Bull).

14
Albert Band, 78, American film director and film producer, frequently collaborated with John Huston.
José Bonilla, 34, Venezuelan boxer, asthma attack.
Lily Carlstedt, 76, Danish Olympic javelin thrower (bronze medal at 1948 women's javelin throw, 1952 women's javelin throw).
George William Coventry, 11th Earl of Coventry, 68, British peer and politician.
W. Nelson Francis, 91, America author, linguist and university professor, scholar of the English language.
June Jordan, 65, Caribbean-American poet, essayist and activist, breast cancer.

15
Said Belqola, 45, Moroccan referee of the 1998 FIFA World Cup final, cancer.
Silas Bissell, 60, American activist and member of The Weatherman, brain cancer.
Nadreh AlZin, 63, The mother of Shamcy, Anas and Fahd AlGhazzi, Passed away after 6 days on life support after she suffered a fall and a fatal head injury in Winona, MN.
Choi Hong Hi, 83, South Korean Army general and martial artist, purported "father of Taekwon-Do", cancer.
James D. Hittle, 87, Brigadier General in the US Marine Corps.
Robert Whitehead, 86, Canadian theatre producer, winner of four Tony Awards.

16
Louis Giguère, 90, Canadian politician.
Barbara Goalen, 81, British model.
Harry Oakman, 96, Australian horticulturalist and writer.

17
Bill Adair, 89, American baseball manager and coach (Milwaukee Braves, Atlanta Braves, Chicago White Sox, Montreal Expos).
Louis George Alexander, 70, British teacher and author (New Concept English), a prolific writer of English-language text books.
Abubakar Barde, 67-68, Nigerian politician, Governor of Gongola State.
J. Carter Brown, 67, American director of the National Gallery of Art from 1969 to 1992.
Willie Davenport, 59, American Olympic hurdler (1968 gold medal, 1976 bronze medal).
John C. Davies II, 82, American politician (U.S. Representative for New York's 35th congressional district).
Fritz Walter, 81, German football player, captain of 1954 World Cup winners.

18
Nancy Addison, 54, American soap actress, cancer.
Jack Buck, 77, American sportscaster, best known for announcing MLB games of the St. Louis Cardinals.
Michael Coulson, 74, British lawyer and politician.
Nilima Ibrahim, 81, Bangladeshi writer.
Jack Jenkins, 59, American baseball player (Washington Senators, Los Angeles Dodgers).

19
Sam Baum, 88, English footballer.
Ross Carter, 88, American professional football player (University of Oregon, Chicago Cardinals).
Count Flemming Valdemar of Rosenborg, 80, Danish prince.
Margaret Johnston, 87, Australian-born British actress.
Dorothy Misener Jurney, 93, American journalist.
Pascal Mazzotti, 78, French actor (The King and the Mockingbird).
Dmitry Oboznenko, 71, Soviet Russian painter and graphic artist.
Audrey Skirball-Kenis, 87, American philanthropist.
William H. Summers, 71, British Crown Jeweller.

20
Carlos Badion, 66, Filipino basketball player (basketball at the 1956 Summer Olympics, basketball at the 1960 Summer Olympics).
Erwin Chargaff, 96, Austro-Hungarian biochemist, formulated rules that laid the groundwork for the discovery of the double helix structure of DNA.
Salvador Correa, 86, Argentinian Olympic bobsledder (four-man bobsleigh at the 1948 Winter Olympics).
Timothy Findley, 71, Canadian author (The Wars, Headhunter, Pilgrim, Elizabeth Rex).
Tinus Osendarp, 86, Dutch sprinter (two-time bronze medal at 1936 Summer Olympics: men's 100 metres, men's 200 metres).
Enrique Regüeiferos, 53, Cuban boxer (silver medal in light welterweight boxing at the 1968 Summer Olympics).
Sa'id Akhtar Rizvi, 75, Indian scholar.
Igor Ursov, 75, Soviet and Russian tuberculosis specialist.
John Wirth, 66, American professor and historian of Latin American studies.

21
Sidney Armus, 77, American actor, cancer.
Matt Dennis, 88, American singer, pianist and composer ("Angel Eyes", "Everything Happens to Me", "Violets for Your Furs").
Henry Keith, Baron Keith of Kinkel, 80, British jurist.
Patrick Kelly, 73, English cricketer.
Abu Sabaya, 39, Filipino militant.
Berl Senofsky, 86, American classical violinist and teacher.

22
Chang Cheh, 79,  Hong Kong film director.
David O. Cooke, 81, American civil servant, Director of Administration and Management at the U.S. Department of Defense.
Justin Dart Jr., 71, American activist and advocate for people with disabilities.
Darryl Kile, 33, Major League Baseball player (Houston Astros, Colorado Rockies, St. Louis Cardinals), heart attack.
Ron Kline, 70, American baseball player (Pittsburgh Pirates, Detroit Tigers, Washington Senators).
Eppie Lederer, 83, American advice columnist and media celebrity.
Ann Landers, 83, author & syndicated newspaper columnist, cancer.

23
Lionel Bernstein, 82, South African anti-apartheid activist and political prisoner.
William Fetter, 74, American graphic designer and pioneer in the field of computer graphics.
Fadzil Noor, 63, Malaysian politician and religious teacher, complications following heart bypass surgery.
Carlo Savina, 82, Italian composer and conductor.
Alice Stewart, 95, British physician and epidemiologist.

24
Pedro "El Rockero" Alcazar, 26, Panamanian boxer, injuries sustained during title fight.
Marcelle Bühler, 88, Swiss Olympic alpine skier (women's combined alpine skiing at the 1936 Winter Olympics).
Robert Dorfman, 85, American Harvard economist who did pioneering research in linear programming and environmental economics.
Lorna Lloyd-Green, 92, Australian gynaecologist.
Miles Francis Stapleton Fitzalan-Howard, 86, 17th Duke of Norfolk.
Pierre Werner, 88, Prime Minister of Luxembourg (1959–1974, 1979–1984), considered the "father of the euro".

25
Joe Antolick, 86, American baseball player (Philadelphia Phillies).
Gordon Park Baker, 64, American philosopher, with a major focus on the writings of Ludwig Wittgenstein.
Jean Corbeil, 68, Canadian politician (Minister of Labour, Minister of Transport, member of Parliament).
Henry Thomas Davies, 88, English lifeboatman, participated in more than 500 rescues on the north coast of Norfolk, England.
Derrek Dickey, 51, American professional basketball player and sportscaster (Cincinnati, Golden State Warriors, Chicago Bulls).
Douglas Hugh Everett, 85, British chemist and academic author, known for his contributions to the field of thermodynamics.
Volodymyr Nemoshkalenko, 69, Ukrainian physicist.
Tom Wiesner, 63, American politician and businessman, an owner of the Marina Hotel.

26
Barbara G. Adams, 57, British Egyptologist.
Jay Berwanger, 88, American college football player, first winner of the Heisman Trophy.
Arnold Brown, 88, British General of the Salvation Army.
Donald A. Bullough, 74, British historian and author.
Ira Eaker, 80, American publisher, co-founder of Backstage.
Alan Fox, 82, English industrial sociologist, revolutionised industrial relations.
Dolores Gray, 78, American actress and singer.
James Morgan, 63, British journalist.
Dermot Walsh, 77, Irish actor (Richard the Lionheart, Sea of Sand, The Challenge).
Philip Whalen, 78, American Beat generation poet and Zen Buddhist priest.

27
Sir Charles Carter, 82, British economist and academic administrator.
John Entwistle, 57, English bassist (The Who), heart attack.
Ralph Erickson, 100, American baseball player (Pittsburgh Pirates).
Muharram Fouad, 68, Egyptian actor and singer, starred in Hassan and Nayima with co-star Soad Hosny.
Russ Freeman, 76, American bebop and jazz pianist and songwriter, played with Charlie Parker, Chet Baker, Shelly Manne, Art Pepper.
Robert L. J. Long, 82, American admiral.
Jack Webster, 78, Canadian police officer.
Timothy White, 50, American rock music journalist and editor (Crawdaddy!, Rolling Stone, Billboard).

28
Anatoly Akimov, 54, Soviet Olympic water polo player (gold medal winner in water polo at the 1972 Summer Olympics).
William Dufty, 86, American writer, musician, and activist (Lady Sings the Blues, Sugar Blues).
Doug Elmore, 62, American professional football player (Ole Miss, Washington Redskins).
Arthur "Spud" Melin, 77, American businessman responsible for marketing the hula-hoop and frisbee.
Roger Til, 93, French-American actor.

29
Geoffrey Biggs, 63, British Royal Navy captain of the nuclear-powered submarine HMS Superb during the Cold War.
Terry Bourke, 62, Australian screenwriter, producer and director (Spyforce, Night of Fear, The Tourist).
Jaime Brocal Remohí, 66, Spanish comic book artist.
Rosemary Clooney, 74, American singer and actress ("Come On-a My House", "Hey There", "This Ole House").
Ole-Johan Dahl, 70, Norwegian computer scientist, considered one of the fathers of object-oriented programming.
Henry Henne, 81, Norwegian linguist.
Jan Tomasz Zamoyski, 90, Polish political activist, aristocrat and member of anti-Nazi underground resistance.

30
Claude Berge, 76, French mathematician.
W. Maxwell Cowan, 70, South African neurobiologist.
Gerard Ettinger, 92, British businessman (G Ettinger Ltd) and film producer.
Pete Gray, 87, American one-armed baseball player (St. Louis Browns).
Raúl Sánchez, 71, Cuban-American baseball player (Washington Senators, Cincinnati Redlegs/Reds).
Roberto Villa, 86, Italian actor (The Fornaretto of Venice), pancreatitis.
Dave Wilson, 70, American television director (Saturday Night Live).
Chico Xavier, 92, Brazilian spiritual medium and author.

References 

2002-06
 06